Interstate 80 (I-80) in the US state of Ohio runs across the northern part of the state. Most of the route is part of the Ohio Turnpike; only an  stretch is not part of the toll road. That stretch of road is the feeder route to the Keystone Shortway, a shortcut through northern Pennsylvania that provides access to New York City.

Route description

In Ohio, I-80 enters with I-90 from the Indiana Toll Road and immediately becomes the "James W. Shocknessy Ohio Turnpike", more commonly referred to as simply the Ohio Turnpike. The two Interstates cross rural northwest Ohio and run just south of the Toledo metropolitan area. In Rossford, the turnpike intersects with I-75 in an area known as the Crossroads of America.

In Elyria Township, Lorain County, just west of Cleveland, I-90 splits from I-80 (leaving the turnpike and running northeast as a freeway). I-80 runs east-southeast through the southern suburbs of Cleveland and retains the Ohio Turnpike designation. Just northwest of Youngstown, the Ohio Turnpike continues southeast onto I-76, while I-80 exits the turnpike and runs east to the north of Youngstown, entering Pennsylvania south of Sharon, Pennsylvania.

History

I-80 was constructed as part of the Ohio Turnpike (with the exception of modern I-76 and I-480), the origins of which predate the establishment of the Interstate Highway System in 1956. The Ohio General Assembly created the Ohio Turnpike Commission in 1949, which was the first step in designing and constructing the east–west freeway. Construction began on October 27, 1952, and the freeway was completed on October 1, 1955 (a total of 38 months).

Although I-80 presently uses the Ohio Turnpike across most of the state, it was once planned to split between Norwalk and Edinburg Township, with I-80N passing through Cleveland and I-80S passing through Akron.

Exit list

Auxiliary routes

Notes

References

 Ohio
80
Transportation in Williams County, Ohio
Transportation in Fulton County, Ohio
Transportation in Lucas County, Ohio
Transportation in Wood County, Ohio
Transportation in Ottawa County, Ohio
Transportation in Sandusky County, Ohio
Transportation in Erie County, Ohio
Transportation in Lorain County, Ohio
Transportation in Cuyahoga County, Ohio
Transportation in Summit County, Ohio
Transportation in Portage County, Ohio
Transportation in Mahoning County, Ohio
Transportation in Trumbull County, Ohio